Eric Byler (born January 15, 1972) is an American film director, screenwriter and political activist.

Personal life
Byler identifies as hapa biracial, born to a Chinese American mother and a white American father.  He grew up in Virginia, Hawaii (where he attended Moanalua High School), and California. He graduated from Wesleyan University in 1994, majoring in film. He currently lives in Australia.

Filmmaker 
Byler's senior thesis film, Kenji's Faith, premiered at the Sundance Film Festival in 1995, went on to win six film festival awards, and was a regional finalist in the Student Academy Awards.

His first feature film, Charlotte Sometimes was nominated for two Independent Spirit Awards in 2003, including the John Cassavetes Award for Best Feature under $500,000, and a Best Supporting Actress award for Jacqueline Kim. The film was called "fascinating and illuminating" by film critic Roger Ebert, and won the Audience Award at South by Southwest Film Festival (SXSW), the Special Jury Award at the Florida Film Festival, and the Best Dramatic Feature at the San Diego Asian Film Festival.  The film was distributed theatrically by Visionbox Media and Small Planet Pictures before being released on DVD.

Byler's second feature was the Charlotte Sometimes quasi-sequel, TRE which won the Special Jury Award at the 2007 San Francisco International Asian American Film Festival.  TRE was distributed in theaters and on DVD (May 6, 2008) by Cinema Libre Studio.

His third feature, Americanese, was an adaptation of Shawn Wong's seminal Asian American novel, "American Knees."  It won the Audience Award for Best Narrative Feature at SXSW, in addition to a Special Jury Prize for Outstanding Ensemble Cast, which includes Chris Tashima, Allison Sie, Joan Chen and Kelly Hu.  It was acquired by IFC First Take.

He also directed the PBS / ITVS Television pilot, My Life Disoriented which starred Karin Anna Cheung.

His fourth feature film, 9500 Liberty (co-directed with Annabel Park), was a documentary about immigration and politics.  "9500 Liberty" won the Breakthrough Filmmaker Award at the 2010 Phoenix Film Festival, the Jury Award for Best Documentary at the 2009 Charlotte Film Festival, and the Audience Award for Best Documentary at the 2009 St. Louis International Film Festival.

Byler and Park are currently in post-production on a second documentary feature film Story of America: Journey Into the Divide about voting rights, politics, and race relations.

Byler is a member of the Directors Guild of America and the Writers Guild of America.

Netroots organizer 
In the fall of 2006, Byler volunteered in the Virginia U.S. Senate election. In response to incumbent Senator George Allen's use of the term "Macaca" on the campaign trail, referring to an Indian American student from the University of Virginia, Byler and others formed "Real Virginians for Webb", a group that campaigned for Allen's Democratic opponent, Jim Webb, among the state's Asian and Pacific Islander voters. The Democratic National Committee said that outreach efforts to these voters played a major role in Webb's victory, which he won by less than 9,000 votes.

In 2007, Byler volunteered and created YouTube videos for the "121 Coalition", a national grassroots organization that advocated passage of House Resolution 121, urging the Japanese government to acknowledge and apologize for military rape camps (comfort women) during World War II. The resolution passed on July 30, 2007.

During the 2008 presidential primaries, Byler volunteered as co-director (along with Warren Fu) of a music video of a song written and performed by artist Andres Useche, entitled "Si Se Puede Cambiar", in support of Barack Obama. The video was released on YouTube on February 22, 2008, and was viewed more than half a million times.

In February 2010, Byler and his partner Annabel Park co-founded the Coffee Party USA. Byler directed and edited the "How we Started" video for Coffee Party USA, the "National Kick-off" video,  and other videos that appear on the Coffee Party YouTube channel.  Coffee Party USA is coalition that began with a fan page on Facebook.

Byler also is a content producer for the interactive documentary "2010 Okinawa" exploring the controversy over U.S. bases in Okinawa.  In 2013, Byler and Park teamed up on the web series Story of America (StoryofAmerica.org) which helped to launch both the Moral Monday movement and the "Walking Mayor" Adam O'Neal and the fight for rural healthcare (SaveourHospital.org). In 2015, Byler and comedian Will Rice launched the satirical news channel, One Percent News (OnePercentNews.com) based in Washington, DC.

Filmography 
Kenji's Faith (1994) student thesis
Charlotte Sometimes (2003) — director, writer, producer, editor
My Life Disoriented (2006) — director, producer
Americanese (2006) — director, screen-adaptation
TRE (2008) — director, writer
9500 Liberty (2009) — director, writer, editor
Story of America: Journey Into the Divide (working title, in post production)
The Headless Klansman of Selma (2017)

References

External links
 
 
 Eric Byler on Myspace
 Story of America Facebook page
 Story of America website page
 9500 Liberty website
 9500Liberty (2009)
  Charlotte Sometimes (2003) trailer
 Tre (2008)
 "Si Se Puede Cambiar" Obama Music Video on YouTube
 Through Our Lens Political Blog on AsianWeek.com

Film criticism 
Los Angeles Times review of Charlotte Sometimes (2003)
Washington Post review of Charlotte Sometimes (2003)
Roger Ebert review of Charlotte Sometimes (2003)
Variety review of Tre (2007)
eFilmCritic review of "Tre" (2007)
Roger Ebert review of Americanese (2008)

1972 births
Living people
American music video directors
American male screenwriters
American film directors of Chinese descent
American theatre directors of Chinese descent
Place of birth missing (living people)
American activists
Wesleyan University alumni
Writers from Charlottesville, Virginia
Writers from Honolulu
Film directors from Virginia
Film directors from Hawaii
Screenwriters from Virginia
Screenwriters from Hawaii